Guðmundur Steingrímsson (born 28 October 1972) is an Icelandic politician. He is the son and grandson of former Icelandic Prime Ministers Steingrímur Hermannsson and Hermann Jónasson.

Career
Guðmundur was a member of the Althing for Southwest Constituency from 2013 to 2016, as a member of Bright Future. He was previously elected for the Northwest Constituency in 2009, as a member of the Progressive Party, the party of his father and grandfather, but later announced his resignation from the party. He had previously run for office from a different constituency as a member of the Social Democratic Alliance.

Guðmundur is a musician and published author. He has also worked in television and journalism.

References

Gudmundur Steingrimsson
Gudmundur Steingrimsson
Gudmundur Steingrimsson
Gudmundur Steingrimsson
Gudmundur Steingrimsson
Gudmundur Steingrimsson
Gudmundur Steingrimsson
Gudmundur Steingrimsson
KU Leuven alumni
Uppsala University alumni
Alumni of the University of Oxford
1972 births
Living people
Gudmundur Steingrimsson
Gudmundur Steingrimsson
Gudmundur Steingrimsson